Melanotus longulus is a species of click beetle in the family Elateridae.

Subspecies
These two subspecies belong to the species Melanotus longulus:
 Melanotus longulus longulus
 Melanotus longulus oregonensis (Leconte)

References

Further reading

 

Elateridae
Articles created by Qbugbot
Beetles described in 1853